Andrey Mikhailovich Dostoyevsky (– ) was a Russian architect, engineer, memoirist, building restorer, father of renowned histologist Alexander Dostoyevsky and a brother of famous writer Fyodor Dostoyevsky. Andrey was not as close with Fyodor as his elder brother Mikhail, but they were also friends. They corresponded throughout their lives. Andrey Dostoyevsky's Memoirs (Vospominania), first published in 1930, contain a lot of information on the early years of Fyodor Dostoyevsky's life. Memoirs covers the period of time from 1825 to 1871 and was written in the eight months between 1895—1896.

Career 
In late 1841, Andrey Dostoyevsky moved to Saint Petersburg. The following year, he entered the Saint-Petersburg State University of Architecture and Civil Engineering, graduating in June 1848. Subsequently, he worked as an engineer in Saint Petersburg. He had none of the literary talent of his brothers Fyodor and Mikhail. In 1849 Andrey was arrested as a member of Petrashevsky Circle and placed in Peter and Paul Fortress, because he was mistaken for Mikhail. 13 days later, Andrey was released, but this incident ruined his career. Because of the relations to Dostoyevsky family, he was sent out of Saint Petersburg and appointed as head architect in Elisavetgrad. In July 1850 Andrey Dostoyevsky married Domnika Fedorchenko. They had 2 sons and 2 daughters.

Andrey Dostoyevsky worked as an architect in Elisavetgrad, Simferopol, Dnipropetrovsk. In 1865, he was appointed at Yaroslavl guberniya, where he served on various positions for more than twenty-five years. Widowed in 1887, after his retirement in 1890 he lived alone. In 1897, he died of cancer.

Projects 

 1867 — approved as an architect of the bell tower near the Annunciation church in Yaroslavl; observed the church expanding in Uglich district; designed a fire lookout tower in the town of Mologa.
 1867—1869 — supervised a church reconstruction in Krasnov village (Rostov uyezd).
 1880 — a match factory project for merchant Dunaev (Yaroslavl).
 1882 — chemical factory design near Romanov-Borisoglebsk; iron factory design in Yaroslavl.
 1882 — reconstruction project of the stone chapel in Malo-Bogorodskoye village (Myshkin uyezd).
 1883 — approved a draft project of the bleaching facility near Stepanovo village on Kotorosl River.
 1886 — a project of Nativity of the Theotokos church in Breytovo village (Mologa uyezd).
 1887 — a stone bell tower project for a church in Dmitrovskoye village (Poshekh uyezd).
 1888 — a new bell tower project of the Dormition of the Theotokos church in Zakobyakino village (Lyubim uyezd); a weaving factory project near Nagatino village.
 1890 — a project of five-storey steam mill in Poshekhonye.

References

See also 

1825 births
1897 deaths
Fyodor Dostoyevsky
Russian memoirists
19th-century architects from the Russian Empire
Ukrainian architects
Deaths from cancer in Russia
Saint-Petersburg State University of Architecture and Civil Engineering alumni
Andrei
19th-century memoirists
Prisoners of the Peter and Paul Fortress